Pelican Narrows 206 is an Indian reserve of the Peter Ballantyne Cree Nation in Saskatchewan. It is 5 kilometres south of Pelican Narrows.

References

Indian reserves in Saskatchewan
Division No. 18, Saskatchewan
Peter Ballantyne Cree Nation